The Syro-Malankara Catholic Eparchy of Gurgaon was established by Pope Francis on 26 March 2015. This diocese has a huge territory in north India, including 22 of the 29 states of India. At the southern boundary of the diocese are the states of Gujarat, Madhya Pradesh, Chhattisgarh and Orissa. The bishop's residence and chancery is at the Mar Ivanios Bhavan in Neb Sarai.

References

Syro-Malankara Catholic dioceses
Eastern Catholic dioceses in India
Dioceses established in the 21st century
Christian organizations established in 2015
2015 establishments in Haryana